Uglegorsk is a coastal port town and the administrative center of Uglegorsky District in Sakhalin Oblast, Russia, located on the west coast of Sakhalin Island,  northwest of Yuzhno-Sakhalinsk, the administrative center of the oblast. Population:

History
It was founded as 恵須取町  , it means "between capes " in the Ainu language , during Japanese rule in 1905. It came to Soviet control along with the rest of the Sakhalin Island with the defeat of Japan in World War II. For a time, Uglegorsk was put under consideration for potential sites for the new capital of Sakhalin Oblast.

Town status was granted to it in 1946, along with its present name.The name Uglegorsk means 'coal mountain'.

Administrative and municipal status
Within the framework of administrative divisions, Uglegorsk serves as the administrative center of Uglegorsky District. As an administrative division, it is incorporated within Uglegorsky District as the town of district significance of Uglegorsk. As a municipal division, the town of district significance of Uglegorsk, together with nine rural localities in Uglegorsky District, is incorporated within Uglegorsky Municipal District as Uglegorskoye Urban Settlement.

Economy
Bituminous coal is mined in the surrounding area, giving the town its name. Uglegorsk is also the center of an agricultural area, mainly growing potatoes and other vegetables. Paper and timber products are also produced in the town.

Climate
Uglegorsk has a humid continental climate (Köppen Dfb). The weather on the western side of Sakhalin tends to be drier and more settled than on the eastern side, since the winds from the combined force of the Siberian High and Aleutian Low run almost parallel to the coast with very little travel over water. Moreover, the winds from the summer low tend to lose some of their moisture over the island's mountains.

References

Notes

Sources

Cities and towns in Sakhalin Oblast
Populated coastal places in Russia